The Humpty Dumpty Man is a 1986 Australian TV film which was the first feature directed by P.J. Hogan. It was based on the ALP politician David Combe affair.

Shadlow is a trade consultant who accepts a Soviet trade contract and is accused of international espionage.

The movie was not released theatrically.

References

External links

The Humpty Dumpty Man at Oz Movies

Australian television films
1986 films
1980s English-language films
1980s Australian films